Justice Price may refer to:

Dale Price (1924–1997), associate justice of the Arkansas Supreme Court
J. H. Price (c. 1862–1947), associate justice of the Supreme Court of Mississippi
James Latimer Price (1840–1912), associate justice of the Supreme Court of Ohio
Robert Price (judge) (1653–1733), justice of the Court of Common Pleas of England
Robert T. Price (1903–1982), associate justice of the Kansas Supreme Court
William Ray Price Jr. (born 1952), associate justice of the Supreme Court of Missouri

See also
Price Daniel (1910–1988), associate justice of the Texas Supreme Court